Exercise Mainbrace was the first large-scale naval exercise undertaken by the newly established Allied Command Atlantic (ACLANT), one of the two principal military commands of the North Atlantic Treaty Organization (NATO).  It was part of a series of NATO exercises jointly commanded by Supreme Allied Commander Atlantic Admiral Lynde D. McCormick, USN, and Supreme Allied Commander Europe General Matthew B. Ridgeway, U.S. Army, during the fall of 1952.

Naval activities in north Atlantic, 1946–1951

The strategic importance of control of Norway and the adjacent Norwegian and Barents seas was recognized by Anglo-American naval planners as early as the First World War.  The invasion and Occupation of Norway by Nazi Germany during World War II confirmed the importance of the region, as Germany was able to establish bases for submarine and air operations against Allied convoys bound for the Soviet seaport of Murmansk.

Following the Second World War, several former allied navies executed a number of individual and multinational exercises, including:

 Operation Frostbite (pictured), a 1946 naval exercise involving U.S. Navy Task Group 21.11 led by the aircraft carrier  that operated in the Davis Straits between Labrador and Greenland;
 Exercise Verity, a 1949 combined naval exercise involving the British, French, and Dutch navies which carried out naval bombardment, convoy escort, minesweeping, and Motor Torpedo Boat attack evolutions;
 Exercise Activity, a 1950 Dutch-led naval exercise to refine combined communications and tactical procedures; and
 Exercise Progress, a 1951 French-led combined naval operation with Belgian, French, Danish, Dutch, Norwegian, and British naval units that participating in antisubmarine warfare operations, air defense maneuvers, minesweeping operations, and convoy exercises.

Operational history
Initial planning for Exercise Mainbrace  was initiated by General Dwight D. Eisenhower prior to his resignation as NATO's Supreme Allied Commander Europe (SACEUR) to run for the President of the United States.  The exercise itself was commanded jointly by SACLANT Admiral Lynde D. McCormick, USN, and SACEUR General Matthew B. Ridgeway, U.S. Army, with the immediate theater commander being Admiral Sir Patrick Brind, RN, who was in Commander-in-Chief Allied Forces Northern Europe.

Mainbrace was conducted over twelve days between September 14–25, 1952, and involved nine navies: United States Navy, the British Royal Navy, French Navy, Royal Canadian Navy, Royal Danish Navy, Royal Norwegian Navy, Portuguese Navy, Royal Netherlands Navy, and Belgian Naval Force operating in the Norwegian Sea, the Barents Sea, the North Sea near the Jutland Peninsula, and the Baltic Sea.  Its objective was to convince Denmark and Norway that those nations could be defended against attack from the Soviet Union.  The exercise featured simulated carrier air strikes against "enemy" formation attacking NATO's northern flank near Bodø, Norway, naval air attacks against aggressors near the Kiel Canal, anti-submarine and anti-ship operations, and U.S. marines landing in Denmark.

Force composition

Eighty thousand men, over 200 ships, and 1,000 aircraft participated in Mainbrace. The New York Times military reporter Hanson W. Baldwin described this NATO naval force as being the "largest and most powerful fleet that has cruised in the North Sea since World War I."

Blue Fleet Fast Carrier Task Force
 with Carrier Air Group 17 (CVG-17):

 with Carrier Air Group 6 (CVG-6):

 and Carrier Air Group 1 (CVG-1):

:

:

 4 Naval Air Squadron
824 Naval Air Squadron
 860 Naval Air Squadron - Royal Netherlands Navy

Light aircraft carriers

Escort aircraft carriers

Battleships

Cruisers

Amphibious force flagship

Gallery

Other NATO military exercises - fall 1952
Exercise Mainbrace was part of a series of NATO exercise jointly commanded by Admiral McCormick and General Ridgeway during the Fall of 1952 involving 300,000 military personnel engaged in maneuvers from the Arctic Circle to the Mediterranean Sea.

Two exercises were conducted by NATO's Allied Forces Southern Europe during the Fall of 1952. Ancient Wall was a series of military maneuvers involving ground small unit tactical training, land-based tactical air support, and carrier-based air support. Longstep was a ten-day naval exercise held in the Mediterranean Sea during November 1952 involving over 170 warships and 700 aircraft under the overall command of Admiral Carney. The objective of the Allied ("Blue") forces was to dislodge enemy ("Green") invasion forces from their occupying positions in the Eastern Mediterranean. Green forces included submarines and land-based aircraft. The exercise concluded with an amphibious landing at Lebidos Bay south of İzmir, involving 3000 French, Italian, and Greek troops, including the Battalion Landing Team 3/2, under the overall command of General Robert E. Hogaboom, USMC.

Aftermath
The Soviet Union characterized Mainbrace, Holdfast, and other NATO military exercises as "war-like acts" by NATO, with particular reference to the participation of Norway and Denmark, while the USSR was preparing for its own military maneuvers in the Soviet Zone.

The exercise would also be referenced in the show Project Blue Book

See also

Cold War (1953–1962)
Northern Wedding
 Operation Grand Slam (NATO)
Operation Strikeback

Notes

Sources and references

Sydney Morning Herald - "NATO Ships Enter Baltic Sea" - September 16, 1952
Time, "Operation Mainbrace", September 22, 1952
Time, "NATO: Hedgehogs", September 29, 1952

External links
All Hands magazine online
October 1952
November 1952
January 1953
Photo Gallery - Operation Mainbrace - CV41.org
Senior officials in the NATO military structure, from 1949 to 2001
NATO the First Five Years 1949-1954:
Chapter 7 — The Military Structure
Chapter 9 — The Increase in Strength - International Exercises
Appendix 1 — Chronicle
Annex —  Chapter IX-B:  Soviet armed strength (as estimated in 1954)
"Exercise Mainbrace" - Pathé Films online

Alleged UFO-related aviation incidents
Mainbrace
1952 in military history
September 1952 events in Europe